The men's 5000 metres at the 2009 World Championships in Athletics were held at the Olympic Stadium on 20 and 23 August

Medalists

Summary
In hindsight, this race was the confluence of many of the greats.  Kenenisa Bekele was already the world record holder, the Woolworth double (5 and 10) Olympic champion and the champion at 10,000 here.  At 27, this would be his last successful major championship race.  At 35, Bernard Lagat (a Kenyan transplant to USA) would continue to medal internationally for another 5 years.  Lagat was the defending champion and was the second fastest 1500 runner of all time.  Eliud Kipchoge had the championship record from 2003 and would go on to greater fame in marathon running, winning the Olympic gold medal in 2016 and 2021. And setting the official world record in 2018 and the assisted world record in 2019. A lesser known British runner named Mo Farah was making his first World Championship final after disappointment in the 2008 Olympics.  Two years later, he would go on to start a 6 year long major championship winning streak that would encompass two Olympics and four World Championships in both the 5 and 10.

With the mixture of strength runners like Bekele and Kipchoge, and kickers like Lagat and Farah, the strategy was a question mark.  Could the strength runners burn off the kickers?  Bekele started fast, and most of the field followed along in tow.  Farah lagged 15 metres behind, 100 metres into the race.  University of Wisconsin teammates Matt Tegenkamp and Chris Solinsky marked Bekele as the pace slowed at first.  Bekele led with an uneven pace, running as fast as 60 seconds a lap and as slow as 64.  Everybody else followed for 2300 metres until the Kenyan team, led by Joseph Ebuya all moved to the front as much to assert an even pace if not a fast pace.  Bekele moved back to control the race, marked by Lagat, Kipchoge, Moses Ndiema Kipsiro and Kenyan transplant to Qatar, James Kwalia C'Kurui.  Just under 800 metres to go, Ebuya stepped to the right and gave up.  After coming to a virtual stop he jogged and rejoined the race well out of contention.  The same five leaders remained together at the bell with Jesús España sprinting up to be in short lived contention.  As they sped around the turn and into the backstretch, those five separated from the chasers.  With España fading, Tegenkamp was the last left trying to bridge the gap.  Bekele held the lead through the final turn, with Lagat moving into position to put his move on.  Coming off the turn, Lagat pounced and took the lead, but only by inches.  Side by side, Bekele on the inside and Lagat on the outside, the two sprinted shoulder to shoulder for 40 metres, then Bekele edged in front, slowly widening the gap for a little over a metre by the finish.  Behind them Kwalia emerged from the group to take the bronze.

Records

Qualification standards

Schedule

Results

Heats
Qualification: First 5 in each heat(Q) and the next 5 fastest(q) advance to the final.

Key: PB = Personal best, SB = Seasonal best

Final

Key:   SB = Seasonal best

Splits

References
General
Specific

5000 metres
5000 metres at the World Athletics Championships